This list gives an overview of the locomotives and railbuses of the Palatinate Railway (Pfalzbahn) and the Palatine network of the Royal Bavarian State Railways (Königlich Bayerische Staats-Eisenbahnen).

The Palatinate (Pfalz) is a region in south-western Germany that became part of the Kingdom of Bavaria in 1816, even though it was geographically separate. Its union with Bavaria was not dissolved until the reorganisation of German states after World War II during the occupation of Germany. The Palatinate Railway was a private railway concern formed on 1 January 1870. It was nationalised on 1 January 1909, with its 870 kilometres of track, and went into the Royal Bavarian State Railways.

Overview 

Palatine locomotives were numbered in sequence as well as given names. On being retired, the numbers freed up were reused for newly delivered locomotives. Pontoon locomotives(Schiffsbrückenlokomotiven), as well as engines employed on secondary (Sekundärbahn) and narrow gauge lines used their own numbering scheme with Roman numerals.

The allocation of names was stopped in 1904, because the purchase of the railway by the Bavarian state was approaching. Only four locomotives delivered after that were given names: three P 4s and an L 1. The names chosen were based mainly on towns, castles, rivers and mountains in the Palatinate. The use of names from myths from classical antiquity remained Episode. The special importance of express train locomotives was stressed by naming them after Bavarian monarchs, as well as important people in the Bavarian government and managers of the Palatinate Railway.

The introduction of a classification scheme was first achieved in the Palatinate Railway in 1898. Four main groups were created:

 P - Passenger and express train locomotives (Personen- und Schnellzuglokomotiven) (including tank engines used for these duties) 
 G - Goods train locomotives (Güterzuglokomotiven)
 T - Tank locomotives (Tenderlokomotiven) for mixed duties
 L - Narrow gauge locomotives for branch lines (Tenderlokomotiven für Lokalbahnen)

An Arabic numeral followed the class letter to distinguish between the individual locomotive classes. A superscripted Roman numeral indicated a sub-class. The Palatine class designations were only used on paper and not written on the locomotives themselves.

On the transfer of the Palatine railway network to the Bavarian state railways in 1909 the Bavarian classification system was adopted for new locomotives. Older locomotives however kept their original designations. New locomotives built for the Palatine network continued to receive the range of numbers associated with the Palatinate Railway.

Steam locomotives

Early locomotives for all types of train 

None of the locomotives was given an operating number by the Deutsche Reichsbahn.

Passenger and express train locomotives

Goods train locomotives

Tank locomotives

Narrow gauge locomotives 

The Palatine narrow gauge locomotives procured for the following metre gauge branch lines (Lokalbahnen):

 Ludwigshafen–Dannstadt–Meckenheim 
 Ludwigshafen–Frankenthal–Großkarlbach 
 Speyer–Geinsheim–Neustadt (Haardt)
 Alsenz–Obermoschel

Railbuses 

Palatine railbuses were introduced into the wagon fleet and were given wagon numbers. In addition to the new vehicles listed in the table below, two accumulator cars left by an electric company in 1896/97 were tested. Furthermore, between 1897 and 1900 four four-wheeled passenger coaches – one with an additional centre axle - were converted provisionally to accumulator cars and placed in service. After the delivery of new wagons the passenger coaches were restored to their original state.

See also 
History of rail transport in Germany
Länderbahnen
Palatinate (region)
Palatinate Railway
UIC classification

References

External links
 Dampflokomotiven in Bayern 

Defunct railway companies of Germany
Locomotives of Germany
!
Deutsche Reichsbahn-Gesellschaft locomotives
Bavaria-related lists
Railway locomotive-related lists
German railway-related lists